TAG Airlines was a small airline serving primarily Downtown Cleveland, Ohio with Downtown Detroit, Michigan from 1957 until 1970.

History
Its slogan was "The World's Busiest Airline", and it served airports that were 5–15 minutes from the downtown areas, mainly in Detroit, Michigan, and Cleveland, Ohio. The cause of the crash was found to be a fatigue crack in a fitting in the wing root resulting in failure of the right wing.
Tag started operations with single pilot Piper  Aztec aircraft in 1964 to Columbus, Cincinnati, Pittsburgh and Huntington WV.

Destinations

Cincinnati, Ohio
Cleveland, Ohio (Burke Lakefront Airport)
Columbus, Ohio
Detroit, Michigan (Detroit City Airport)
Pittsburgh, Pennsylvania
Akron, Ohio
Chicago, Illinois (Meigs Field)

See also 
 List of defunct airlines of the United States

References

Defunct airlines of the United States
Airlines established in 1957
Airlines disestablished in 1970